Skancke is a Norwegian family name with some slightly different spellings as Skanke, Schanke, Schanche and others. It is not proved whether all persons with those names descend from the same family line in the Middle Ages. One famous Skancke family is from the 17th Century situated in the old mining town of Røros in Mid-Norway.

Some alleged medieval ancestors of the Skancke families, had coats of arms with one armoured leg in the shield and one armoured leg in the crest. From that fact, some persons have made a theory that the two legs mean a link to the three legs in the arms of the monarchical dynasty of the Isle of Man. Norwegian genealogists and heraldists of today, however, provide little further support to such a theory, and there are many coats of arms with armoured legs exist in other countries. The name Skanke might mean a leg and the arms thus being canting arms. There are several variants of the arms through the ages: the shield divided, a rose at the knee of the leg, the crest with an armoured arm holding a sword, and the crest with peacock feathers.

Several family members belong to Skanke Family Association.

The Skancke/Schancke/Schanche etc. families have had - and still have today - many prominent members and descendants in Norway. They have been i.a. famous clergymen, civil servants, business men, sportsmen and politicians.

References
Hans Cappelen: Norske slektsvåpen, Oslo 1969 (2nd edition Oslo 1976) page 26 and 195 (with further references)
G.V.C Young O.B.E. Fra Skanke-slektens historie, 1986
The three legs go to Scandinavia a monograph on the Manx royal family and their Scandinavian descendants, Peel: Mansk-Svenska Pub.Co.17 North View, 1981

Noble families
Norwegian families
Irish families
Surnames